Warren Harry (born Warren Philip Harry, 1953 – 10 March 2008) (also known as Warren Bacall) was a British songwriter and performer.

Biography
Harry was born in Aylesbury, Buckinghamshire, England.

From 1977 to the mid-1980s, Warren Harry released a number of singles under both the name Warren Harry and Warren Bacall. These were: "I am a Radio", "Sail On" (Bronze Records, 1977), "1965" (Ellie Jay Records, 1978), "Radio Show" (Polydor Records, 1979), "Welcome to Judy's World" (Polydor, 1980), "Lions and Tigers" (Stage Coach Records, 1982) and "Brief Encounter" (Pilot Records, 1984). In the late 1970s, Harry performed with his band, The Yum Yum Band. Members of Harry's backing bands included Graham Dibble (guitar, vocals), Michael (Paddy) Burns (drums), backing vocals, Paul Kendal (bass guitar), John Clarke (drums), John Kayne (keyboards), Pete Farley (bass), Jakko M Jakszyk (guitar) and Josh Gale (bass).

He subsequently wrote a number of songs for other artists including several songs by Bucks Fizz (such as "When We Were Young" a UK Top 10 hit), John Otway, Anthony Newley and Japanese singer Yōko Oginome.

Other songs written for Bucks Fizz included "I'd Like to Say I Love You" (as Warren Harry) from Hand Cut, and as Warren Bacall: "Rules of the Game" and "Oh Suzanne" from Greatest Hits, "Indebted to You" and "Thief in the Night" from I Hear Talk and "In Your Eyes".  The latter four were all co-written with Andy Hill. The majority of these songs were written about tragic female characters and were sung by the female members of the group.

Harry died from a pulmonary embolism in his home in Cymmer, Wales on 10 March 2008, aged 54. He was living with his partner Annie Whitaker and her son at the time.

References

1953 births
2008 deaths
People from Aylesbury
British songwriters
British pop singers
Deaths from pulmonary embolism